Elmer Young Brown (August 25, 1883 – January 23, 1955) was a pitcher in Major League Baseball. He pitched from 1911 to 1915 for the St. Louis Browns and Brooklyn Dodgers.

External links

1883 births
1955 deaths
Baseball players from Indiana
Major League Baseball pitchers
Brooklyn Dodgers players
Brooklyn Robins players
St. Louis Browns players
Marion Diggers players
Akron Champs players
Montgomery Rebels players
Newark Indians players
Harrisburg Senators players
New Orleans Pelicans (baseball) players
Newport News Shipbuilders players